Mollenhauer is a surname. Notable people with the surname include:

 Edward Mollenhauer (1827–1914), American violinist and composer 
 Emil Mollenhauer (1855–1927), American musician, orchestra violinist and conductor
 Henry Mollenhauer (born 1876), American tennis player
 Klaus Mollenhauer (1928–1998), German pedagogical theorist
 Paula Mollenhauer (1908–1988, German athlete and Olympian